Thomas Harris (1817? – November 29, 1884) was the first mayor of Victoria, British Columbia, serving from 1862 to 1865.

Born in Almeley, Herefordshire, Harris married Emily Dickinson, a widow, in Liverpool in 1848. Harris came to Victoria by way of California in 1858, at the height of the Cariboo gold rush.  He ran a slaughterhouse for a time, then became a butcher shortly afterward and made his fortune.

A jovial man who had an opinion on everything and wasn't afraid to tell whoever would listen, he was a likely candidate for election in 1862 when the town's father decided to incorporate the town. At election time, Harris won by "forest of hands" amid a group of 600 men. During his second official council meeting, the 300 pound (136 kg) Harris had a chair collapse under his own weight.

In 1873, he was named sergeant-at-arms for the provincial legislature. He was named high sheriff for Vancouver Island in 1876.

Harris Green, an area within Victoria, is named after him.

His stepson Robert Dickinson took over the shop in New Westminster and served as mayor of that city.

References

Mayors of Victoria, British Columbia
1817 births
1884 deaths